Jerablus Tahtani is a small tell near Carchemish in present-day Syria, which was occupied from the Chalcolithic period through the Early Bronze Age. Then, after a hiatus, it was occupied from the Iron Age through the Islamic period. It was excavated  from 1991 to 2000 by the British as part of the Syrian government's Tishreen Dam rescue project. As of 2000 the site was still not underwater. This project successively developed into the Land of Carchemish project.

References

External links
British Excavations at Jerablus Tahtani, Syria

Bronze Age Anatolia
Carchemish
Chalcolithic